James Oertell Burson (October 13, 1940 – August 2, 2022) was an American football player from LaGrange, Georgia.

Burson played college football at Auburn and was selected in the eleventh round of the 1963 NFL Draft by the St. Louis Cardinals. He was also selected by the Houston Oilers in the eighth round of the 1963 AFL Draft.

Burson played five seasons with the Cardinals from 1963–1967 and intercepted 12 passes. He also returned a punt 68 yards for a touchdown against the San Francisco 49ers in 1964. He finished his NFL career in 1968 with the Atlanta Falcons.

Following his playing career, Burson remained in metro Atlanta and began coaching at the high school level. The highlight of his career was a 12-year stint as head coach at Milton High School from 1974 to 1985.

Burson died on August 2, 2022, at the age of 81.

References

1940 births
2022 deaths
Players of American football from Georgia (U.S. state)
St. Louis Cardinals (football) players
Atlanta Falcons players
Auburn Tigers football players
People from LaGrange, Georgia